Hudson Township is the name of some places in the U.S. state of Michigan:

 Hudson Township, Charlevoix County, Michigan
 Hudson Township, Lenawee County, Michigan
 Hudson Township, Mackinac County, Michigan

See also 
 Hudson, a city in Lenawee County
 Hudson Township (disambiguation)

Michigan township disambiguation pages